Jonathan Fisher (born 15 September 1988 in Kingston upon Thames, England) is a rugby union coach for London Irish. He played at Flanker or No. 8.

He was educated at Wellington College in Crowthorne, Berkshire, where he played for the 1st XV that were eliminated in the Daily Mail Cup at the semi-final stage in 2007. He also played at Lock in the side that got knocked out at the same stage a year earlier.

He was a member of the England Under-20 team that reached the final of the 2008 IRB Junior World Championship. He also played for the England Sevens team at the 2008 Hong Kong Sevens.

He made his club debut for London Irish as a substitute against the Ospreys on 4 November 2007, in the 2007–08 EDF Energy Cup. He also appeared in the Premiership as well as an appearance off the bench for the England Saxons against Portugal.

At the end of the 2010–11 Aviva Premiership, Fisher left London Irish to join the Bedford Blues in the Greene King IPA Championship.
Where he stayed for a season and then re-joined London Irish for the 2012/13 season in the 2012-13 Aviva Premiership.

On 1 September 2014, Fisher signed for Northampton Saints from the 2014-15 season. After an impressive first season with Northampton Saints, Fisher was picked to represent England at Twickenham against the Barbarians.

He left Bristol to take a coaching role with London Irish's academy in August 2017.

References

External links 
Guinness Premiership profile
London Irish profile
England Profile

1988 births
Living people
English rugby union players
London Irish players
Rugby union flankers
People educated at Wellington College, Berkshire
Rugby union players from Kingston upon Thames